Chamaebatiaria is a monotypic genus of aromatic shrub in the rose family containing the single species Chamaebatiaria millefolium, which is known by the common names fern bush and desert sweet. Its genus name comes from its physical resemblance to the mountain miseries of genus Chamaebatia, which are not closely related. This is a hairy, sticky plant covered in fernlike foliage made up of fronds of small leaflets. At the ends of the erect branches of this spreading bush are inflorescences of white roselike flowers. This shrub is a resident of scrub, woodland, and forests in western North America. The closest relative of Spiraeanthus.

Notes

External links

Jepson Manual Treatment
Chamaebatiaria millefolium USDA Plants Profile
Ecology
Photo gallery

Sorbarieae
Monotypic Rosaceae genera
Flora of the Western United States